Tawan may refer to:
 Tawan, Queensland, a town in Tuan Forest, Fraser Coast Region, Queensland, Australia
 a misspelling of  Taiwan